= Tlos (Caria) =

Town of ancient Caria

Coordinates: 36°36′07″N 28°04′37″E

Tlos (Ancient Greek: Τλῶς), also known as Gelos, was a town of ancient Caria. The town name does not appear in ancient writers but is inferred from epigraphic evidence.

Its site is tentatively located near Pinarlıbükü, Asiatic Turkey.
